One Heart is the eighth English-language and nineteenth studio album by Canadian singer Celine Dion, released by Columbia/Epic Records on 24 March 2003. It was promoted by the lead single "I Drove All Night". One Heart was produced mainly by Swedish producers: Max Martin, Rami Yacoub, Peer Åström, Anders Bagge and Kristian Lundin. It topped the charts in various countries and was certified multi-platinum, platinum and gold around the world. One Heart has sold over five million copies worldwide.

Background and content
The release of this album marked the beginning of A New Day..., Dion's five-year concert arrangement in The Colosseum at Caesars Palace in Las Vegas.

One Heart contains songs produced by Max Martin, Rami Yacoub, Peer Åström, Anders Bagge, Ric Wake, Kristian Lundin, Kara DioGuardi, John Shanks, Guy Roche, and others. It includes a cover of Roy Orbison's "I Drove All Night", made famous by Cyndi Lauper. Another song, "Reveal" was written by Cathy Dennis who also wrote "Toxic" for Britney Spears and "Can't Get You Out of My Head" for Kylie Minogue, among others. "Sorry for Love (2003 version)" is actually an original version of the song. The dance version was released a year earlier on A New Day Has Come. Already available on the A New Day Has Come 2002 special limited edition, "Coulda Woulda Shoulda" was included here as well. One Heart also features "Have You Ever Been in Love", taken from A New Day Has Come. The last track on the album, "Je t'aime encore" was recorded also in French and included on Dion's next album, 1 fille & 4 types.

In June 2004, a bonus DVD called One Year... One Heart was included on some editions of A New Day... Live in Las Vegas, containing the recording of "I Drove All Night" and "Have You Ever Been in Love", and the making of "One Heart" music video among other features.

Promotion
In the United States, "I Drove All Night", "Have You Ever Been in Love", "One Heart", and "Love Is All We Need" were used from 2003 to 2004 in an advertising campaign for DaimlerChrysler, and the CD's inlay cover had the Chrysler logo and slogan.

Singles
"I Drove All Night" was chosen as the leadoff single and became a hit, reaching number one in Canada, Belgium and Sweden. Although "Have You Ever Been in Love" was already featured on Dion's previous album A New Day Has Come, it was released as the second single from One Heart in the United States and third in selected countries. It was successful on the Adult Contemporary charts in the US and Canada, reaching number two and three, respectively. The title track promoted the album as the second single outside the United States, and reached top forty in various countries, including number twenty-seven in the United Kingdom. There were also two radio releases at the end of 2003: "Stand by Your Side" in the US and "Faith" in Canada.

Critical response

The album received mainly mixed reviews from most music critics. AllMusic's senior editor Stephen Thomas Erlewine rated it two-and-a-half stars out of possible five, writing that the collaboration with Britney Spears's producer Max Martin in three tracks was a sign of "desperation that underscores every minute of One Heart, where it seems like Dion will do anything to stay on the charts". Erlewine also wrote that "One Heart favors a smooth Vegas-showstopper gloss to radio-ready sheen, which only accentuates the lack of cohesiveness here" and that the album "reveals all her weaknesses". Chuck Arnold of People wrote a mixed review towards the album's songs, calling it "a bit jarring at times" and that "Dion sounds so strangely subdued on some tracks, you keep waiting for her to really let rip". Either way, he wrote positively that "There is a lightness to One Heart that has been missing from much of Dion's previous work, as she leans more toward upbeat dance numbers, easy-listening rock and even borderline country-pop".

Entertainment.ie's Andrew Lynch was more negative, writing that "The problem is, Dion's songwriters seem to have been under strict instructions to keep the material as bland as possible. And while her glass-shattering voice is as spectacular as ever, she still doesn't sound as if she believes a word of what she's singing. One Heart is certainly one of her better collections - but frankly, that isn't saying very much". The Guardian'''s Betty Clarke wrote that "Dion proves she can be more than a series of hollow - if album-shifting - sentiments". Darryl Sterdan wrote a very negative review for Jam!, saying that "it's bad enough the 14-song CD is full of unoriginal, instantly forgettable fluff -- leftover Britney bubble-pop from Max Martin, cliche chest-pounding power ballads, a title cut that's a blatant Shania soundalike and a Cher-style Eurodisco revamp of the Roy Orbison hit "I Drove All Night," which she's already turned into a Chrysler jingle".

Instead of the mixed and negative reviews, a positive review came from Amazon's Rebecca Wallwork, who praised Dion for "an unrelenting theme of joy and believing in one's self" and highlighted the album for "being both well timed and well executed". But she revealed that "it contains no surprises, but then, besides her voice, that's one of Dion's biggest assets". In a more positive review, Entertainment Weeklys Elisabeth Vincentelli questioned "why Celine get so little respect?" and later went to praise the album for "Dion's uncanny ability to infuse sincerity into aural Hallmark cards and sound like the only person on earth who believes in true love". In the end, she wrote: "And in our age of postmodern ironists, isn't it refreshing to encounter someone who so genuinely loves her job?" Slant Magazines Sal Cinquemani praised "the album as a whole", saying that "she continues the restrained approach of her last record, both in production and performance". He finished the review, noting that "One Heart may be the smartest album Dion could make at this stage in her career". Billboard praised the album by concluding: "One Heart may not crackle with the noise of an "event" record, but it succeeds at something far more important: It is a fine piece of music".

Commercial performance
In Canada, One Heart shot to the top of the chart, selling 97,000 copies in its first week, making it the biggest debut of the year. It spent eight weeks inside top ten of the Canadian Albums Chart and was certified three-times Platinum by the CRIA for shipment of 300,000 units. In France, One Heart also debuted at number one and remained at the top for two weeks. It was certified Platinum in July 2003 for sales of 300,000 copies. One Heart also entered the charts at the top position in Denmark and Belgium Flanders. In both countries, it stayed at number one for a second week. It was certified Platinum in Denmark and Gold in Belgium. The album also topped the chart in Switzerland, where it achieved Platinum status. One Heart topped the chart in Greece as well, and was certified Gold there. It became a top ten album in many other European countries, including the United Kingdom, where it peaked at number four, was certified Gold, and has sold over 204,000 copies. On the European Top 100 Albums, One Heart reached number two, and was certified Platinum by the IFPI for selling over one million copies in Europe.

In the United States, One Heart entered the Billboard 200 chart at number two, selling 432,000 copies. The next week, it fell to number four, selling 166,000 units. In the third week, One Heart occupied the number eight position with sales of 117,000 copies. Later, it fell to number eleven, selling another 116,000 units. In April 2003, One Heart was certified two-times Platinum by the RIAA for shipment of two million copies in the US. The album also reached top ten in Australia and New Zealand, and achieved Platinum status in both countries. According to Billboard, One Heart was the tenth best-selling album in the first half of 2003, selling 1.3 million in that span. According to the IFPI, One Heart became the tenth best-selling album around the world in 2003. It has sold over five million copies worldwide.

Accolades

In 2003, Dion won the American Music Award for Favorite Adult Contemporary Artist and was nominated for Favorite Pop/Rock Female Artist. In 2004, she also won Dragon Award for International Female Artist of the Year and "Have You Ever Been in Love" won ASCAP London Award and BMI London Award for one of the Most Performed Songs in the United States. Dion was also nominated for four Juno Awards of 2004, including: Artist of the Year, Album of the Year (One Heart) and Fan Choice Award. Nominations for other awards include: Billboard Music Award for Hot Adult Contemporary Artist, MuchMoreMusic Award for "I Drove All Night" and Félix Award for Artist of the Year Achieving the Most Success in a Language Other Than French.

Track listingNotes'''
  signifies an additional producer

Charts

Weekly charts

Monthly charts

Year-end charts

All-time charts

Certifications and sales

Release history

See also
List of number-one albums from the 2000s (Denmark)
List of number-one albums of 2003 (Canada)
List of number-one singles of 2003 (France)

References

External links
 

2003 albums
Albums produced by Guy Roche
Albums produced by Humberto Gatica
Albums produced by John Shanks
Albums produced by Max Martin
Albums produced by Rami Yacoub
Albums produced by Ric Wake
Celine Dion albums
Columbia Records albums
Epic Records albums